Nancy Sorel (born May 14, 1964) is a Canadian-American actress known for her roles on many TV series.

Life and career
Born and raised in Fall River, Massachusetts, Sorel received a degree in Theatre and Film from the University of Massachusetts/ Amherst. After graduation she went to New York City and began her acting career starring in Off Broadway plays, commercials, and the role of Coco on the ABC daytime drama One Life to Live.

Her roles in television includes TV series  Generations, Murder, She Wrote, The X-Files, The Outer Limits, Cold Squad, Da Vinci's Inquest, Stargate SG-1 and The 4400.

She played also the role of Sammy on Fox’s sitcom Down the Shore (1992-1993). Recently, she plays Clara Fine on Less Than Kind (since 2008) and Claire Eastman on Cashing In (since 2009).

Other roles of Sorel includes Crow's Nest (1992)  and I Love You, Don't Touch Me! (1997) movies. She played also in the TV movie The Man Who Used to Be Me (2000), co-starred Rob Estes, William Devane and Laurie Holden.

In 2009, she won a Canadian Comedy Awards for the TV series Less Than Kind.

Nancy Sorel is married to actor Paul Magel.

Filmography

Film

Television

External links

Living people
Actresses from Massachusetts
American film actresses
American television actresses
American voice actresses
Canadian film actresses
Canadian television actresses
Canadian voice actresses
1964 births
People from Fall River, Massachusetts
Canadian Comedy Award winners
21st-century American women